Émile Biayenda (1927 – 23 March 1977) was the Archbishop of Brazzaville in Congo from 1971 to 1977 and was also a cardinal of the Catholic Church.

He was born in 1927 in Mpangala, Vindza. He was ordained to the priesthood in 1958 and was consecrated as a bishop in 1970. He was elevated to the cardinalate by Pope Paul VI in 1973. He was murdered in 1977.

His cause of canonization has commenced – he now has the title of Servant of God with the initiation of the cause in 1995 under Pope John Paul II.

Biography

Birth
Émile Biayenda was born in 1927 in Mpangala, Vindza

Education
Biayenda attended several institutions for education for his childhood studies and his studies for the priesthood.

 Catholic Mission School at Kindamba, 1937–1942. 
 Catholic Mission School at Bjoundi, 1942–1944.
 Minor Seminary of St. Paul at Mbamou, 1944–1950.
 Major Seminary of Brazzaville, 1950–1959.
 University of Lyon in France, 1966–1969.

During this time in France, he obtained a licentiate in sociology and in Catholic theology.

Church career
He was ordained to the priesthood in 1958 and was later consecrated a bishop on 17 May 1960 by Cardinal Sergio Pignedoli. Biayenda was known for radical social views throughout his pastoral ministry. This was a contributing factor to his abduction and murder.

His view points on humanitarian issues were quite critical of his nation's government. This strained relations between the church and state. He spoke out against state injustices and on persecution. He also participated in the Synod of Bishops in 1971 and sent a pastoral letter in Congo on the theme of development and the role of Catholics in the nation.

Pope Paul VI created him the Cardinal-Priest of San Marco Agro in Lauretino in the consistory of 5 March 1973. His elevation made him the first cardinal from Congo.

Murder
He was abducted from his residence next to the Sacred Heart Cathedral of Brazzaville in the afternoon of 22 March 1977 and was killed on the night of 23 March 1977 by a group of soldiers. The real cause for this is still undetermined.

Beatification cause
A cause for canonization was opened at the behest of Pope John Paul II via the Congregation for the Causes of Saints on 20 March 1995. He was granted the posthumous title of Servant of God as a result of the opening.

The diocesan process for the late cardinal's beatification spanned from 21 October 1996 and was finished on 14 June 2003. A historical commission was assigned to the cause and completed its work in 2014. The Congregation later validated the diocesan process on 29 May 2015. The next step would be for him to be declared Venerable with the recognition of his heroic virtues.

References

External links
Catholic Hierarchy 
Cardinals of the Holy Roman Church

1927 births
1977 deaths
Republic of the Congo cardinals
Republic of the Congo murder victims
Cardinals created by Pope Paul VI
20th-century Roman Catholic martyrs
20th-century venerated Christians
University of Lyon alumni
Servants of God
Republic of the Congo expatriates in France
Roman Catholic archbishops of Brazzaville